NBX can refer to:

 The Nightmare Before Christmas
 nbx, the ISO 639-3 code for the Wangkumara language
 NetBIOS over IPX/SPX